Gasklockan is a planned skyscraper, located in Norra Djurgårdsstaden district of Stockholm, Sweden. The complex is designed by the Swiss architecture firm Herzog & de Meuron, commissioned by the Swedish developer Oscar Properties, and would contain approximately 320 residential units. Ground breaking was planned first quarter 2016.

In November 2019 the City of Stockholm announced that the agreement with Oscar Properties had been cancelled due to arrears with payment of the purchase price of the ground.

See also
 Architecture of Stockholm

References

Buildings and structures in Stockholm
Buildings and structures under construction in Sweden
Skyscrapers in Sweden